Kuznetsk (Russian: Кузне́цк) is a town in Penza Oblast, Russia.

Kuznetsk may also refer to:

Kuznetsk, former name of Novokuznetsk, a city in Kemerovo Oblast in south-western Siberia
Kuznetsk Basin, a large Russian coal mining region in southwestern Siberia
Leninsk-Kuznetsky (city), a city in the Kuznetsk Basin
Leninsk-Kuznetsky District, an administrative district in the Kemerovo Oblast, Russia, which lies in the Kuznetsk Basin
Kuznetsk Depression, a geological landform in south-central Siberia

See also
Kuznetsk Alatau, a mountain range in southern Siberia
Novokuznetsk, the second most populous city in Kemerovo Oblast, also known as Kuzbass (Кузба́сс), which is a portmanteau for the Kuznetsk Basin